Sri Sri Madhab Than is a pilgrim center dedicated to lord Krishna. It is situated in Kampur of Nagaon District in the middle of Assam, India.

References
 Official Blog of Sri Sri Madhab Than (Unicode Version) 

Hindu temples in Assam